Joseph H. Carey (November 14, 1895 – July 22, 1962) was a Guard and tackle in the National Football League (NFL).

Biography
Carey was born on November 14, 1895, in Chicago.

Career
Carey played with the Chicago Cardinals during the 1920 NFL season. The following season, he played with the Green Bay Packers.

He played at the collegiate level at the Illinois Institute of Technology.

See also
 List of Green Bay Packers players

References

1895 births
1962 deaths
Players of American football from Chicago
American football guards
American football tackles
Illinois Tech Scarlet Hawks football players
Chicago Cardinals players
Green Bay Packers players